This is a list of seasons completed by the North Carolina Tar Heels football team of the National Collegiate Athletic Association (NCAA) Division I Football Bowl Subdivision (FBS). Since the team's creation in 1888, the Tar Heels have participated in more than 1,100 officially sanctioned games, including 30 bowl games.

The Tar Heels have been a member of a few conferences. Initially competing as an independent school, North Carolina joined the Southern Intercollegiate Athletic Association in 1895, where it was a member until 1921. Between 1922 and 1952, the Tar Heels competed in the Southern Conference, where it won 3 conference championships. In 1953, North Carolina joined the Atlantic Coast Conference as a founding member, where it has been a member ever since.

Seasons

Notes

References

North Carolina Tar Heels

North Carolina Tar Heels football seasons